In computer science, a parallel external memory (PEM) model is a cache-aware, external-memory abstract machine. It is the parallel-computing analogy to the single-processor external memory (EM) model. In a similar way, it is the cache-aware analogy to the parallel random-access machine (PRAM). The PEM model consists of a number of processors, together with their respective private caches and a shared main memory.



Model

Definition 
The PEM model is a combination of the EM model and the PRAM model. The PEM model is a computation model which consists of  processors and a two-level memory hierarchy. This memory hierarchy consists of a large  external memory (main memory) of size  and  small  internal memories (caches). The processors share the main memory. Each cache is exclusive to a single processor. A processor can't access another’s cache. The caches have a size  which is partitioned in blocks of size . The processors can only perform operations on data which are in their cache. The data can be transferred between the main memory and the cache in blocks of size .

I/O complexity 
The  complexity measure of the PEM model is the I/O complexity, which determines the number of parallel blocks transfers between the main memory and the cache. During a parallel block transfer each processor can transfer a block. So if  processors load parallelly a data block of size  form the main memory into their caches, it is considered as an I/O complexity of  not . A program in the PEM model should minimize the data transfer between main memory and caches and operate as much as possible on the data in the caches.

Read/write conflicts 
In the PEM model, there is no  direct communication network between the P processors. The processors have to communicate indirectly over the main memory. If multiple processors try to access the same block in main memory concurrently read/write conflicts occur. Like in the PRAM model, three different variations of this problem are considered:
 Concurrent Read Concurrent Write (CRCW): The same block in main memory can be read and written by multiple processors concurrently.
 Concurrent Read Exclusive Write (CREW): The same block in main memory can be read by multiple processors concurrently. Only one processor can write to a block at a time.
 Exclusive Read Exclusive Write (EREW): The same block in main memory cannot be read or written by multiple processors concurrently. Only one processor can access a block at a time.
The following two algorithms solve the CREW and EREW problem if  processors write to the same block simultaneously.
A first approach is to serialize the write operations. Only one processor after the other writes to the block. This results in a total of  parallel block transfers. A second approach needs  parallel block transfers and an additional block for each processor. The main idea is to schedule the write operations in a  binary tree fashion and gradually combine the data into a single block. In the first round  processors combine their blocks into  blocks. Then  processors combine the  blocks into . This procedure is continued until all the data is combined in one block.

Comparison to other models

Examples

Multiway partitioning 
Let  be a vector of d-1 pivots sorted in increasing order. Let  be an unordered set of N elements. In the following algorithm the input is partitioned into N/P-sized contiguous segments  in main memory. The processor i primarily works on the segment . The multiway partitioning algorithm (PEM_DIST_SORT) uses a PEM prefix sum algorithm to calculate the prefix sum with the optimal  I/O complexity. This algorithm simulates an optimal PRAM prefix sum algorithm.
 // Compute parallelly a d-way partition on the data segments 
 for each processor i in parallel do
     Read the vector of pivots  into the cache.
     Partition  into d buckets and let vector  be the number of items in each bucket.
 end for
 
 Run PEM prefix sum on the set of vectors  simultaneously.
 
 // Use the prefix sum vector to compute the final partition
 for each processor i in parallel do
 end for
 
 Using the prefix sums stored in  the last processor P calculates the vector  of bucket sizes and returns it.

If the vector of  pivots M and the input set A are located in contiguous memory, then the d-way partitioning problem can be solved in the PEM model with  I/O complexity. The content of the final buckets have to be located in contiguous memory.

Selection 
The selection problem is about finding the k-th smallest item in an unordered list  of size .
 if  then 
     
     return 
 end if 
 
 //Find median of each 
 for each processor  in parallel do 
     
 end for 
 
 // Sort medians
 
 
 // Partition around median of medians
 
 
 if  then 
     return 
 else 
     return 
 end if

Under the assumption that the input is stored in contiguous memory, PEMSELECT has an I/O complexity of:

Distribution sort 
Distribution sort partitions an input list  of size  into  disjoint buckets of similar size. Every bucket is then sorted recursively and the results are combined into a fully sorted list.

If  the task is delegated to a cache-optimal single-processor sorting algorithm.

Otherwise the following algorithm is used:
 // Sample  elements from 
 for each processor  in parallel do
     if  then
         
         Load  in -sized pages and sort pages individually
     else
         
         Load and sort  as single page
     end if
     Pick every 'th element from each sorted memory page into contiguous vector  of samples
 end for 
 
 in parallel do
     Combine vectors  into a single contiguous vector 
     Make  copies of : 
 end do
 
 // Find  pivots 
     
 end for
 
 Pack pivots in contiguous array 
 
 // Partition around pivots into buckets 
 
 
 // Recursively sort buckets
     recursively call  on bucket of size 
     using  processors responsible for elements in bucket 
 end for

The I/O complexity of PEMDISTSORT is:

where

If the number of processors is chosen that and  the I/O complexity is then:

Other PEM algorithms 

Where  is the time it takes to sort  items with  processors in the PEM model.

See also 

 Parallel random-access machine (PRAM)
 Random-access machine (RAM)
 External memory (EM)

References

Algorithms
Models of computation
Analysis of parallel algorithms
External memory algorithms
Cache (computing)